Fred Christian Gartner (March 14, 1896 – September 1, 1972) was a Republican member of the U.S. House of Representatives from Pennsylvania.

Biography
Born in Philadelphia, Pennsylvania on March 14, 1896, Fred C. Gartner was a son of German immigrants. He attended the public schools and Brown Preparatory School in Philadelphia. He served as a yeoman in the United States Naval Reserve in 1918 and 1919. He graduated from the law department of Temple University in Philadelphia in 1920. He was a member of the Pennsylvania State Civil Service Commission at Philadelphia from 1928 to 1932. He served in the Pennsylvania State House of Representatives in 1933 and 1934.

Gartner was elected as a Republican to the 76th Congress. He was an unsuccessful candidate for reelection in 1940. He served chairman of the board for the Hol-Gar Manufacturing Corporation of Pennsylvania.

References

1896 births
1972 deaths
American people of German descent
Republican Party members of the United States House of Representatives from Pennsylvania
Republican Party members of the Pennsylvania House of Representatives
20th-century American politicians
Temple University Beasley School of Law alumni
United States Navy reservists